Icononzo is a municipality located in the department of Tolima in Colombia. The average temperature is 21°F (-6°C), altitude 1304 metres (4278').

History 
In 1875 there was the community of Guamitos inherited by Don Vicente Reyes Daza.

During the colonial era and by the year 1888, Adrian Lords Escobar, Guillermo Quijano, Alberto Williamson and others arrived and created a small community along the road leading to Guamitos, half an hour way. By the Ordinance No. 3 of July 16 of that year it was instituted as "Corregimiento Icononzo". 

By the year 1892, Mr. Reyes Daza and Williamson began the assembly of the estates Canada and Scotland. Labor supply in the region constituted by the problem of housing shortages, resulting in problems of invasion. This situation led the ranch owners to donate land to address the problem, begging the construction of 17 new homes. This resulted in the formation of a new town, which, because of their increasing wealth and development, was upgraded to a municipality by Ordinance No. 1915 of April 21, after being returned to the department of Tolima in other territories that were under the jurisdiction of Cundinamarca.

Icononzo is known for a natural bridge over a very deep canyon used in the violent events of the civil turmoil known as La Violencia following the Bogotazo. The arch was painted by the Italian painter Gerolamo Fumagalli in the 19th century.

In 1989, the Atlantis commune, founded in Burtonport, Ireland, by Jenny James, relocated near to Icononzo.

References

Municipalities of Tolima Department
Natural arches
Landforms of Colombia